José Pedro Cea Urriza (1 September 1900 – 18 September 1970) was a Uruguayan football player as a striker and coach.

Playing career

Club career
Cea was born in MontevideoMontevideo. At club level, he played for Nacional, where he won several Uruguayan championships.

International career
Cea made his debut for Uruguay in November 1923. He was part of Uruguay's championship-winning team at the 1923 South American Championship.

In 1924 Cea again won a continental championship as Uruguay won their fifth title at the 1924 tournament.

Cea won gold medals at both the 1924 and 1928 Summer Olympics.

He was Uruguay's leading goalscorer in the 1930 FIFA World Cup. He scored the crucial equalising goal in the World Cup final against Argentina, levelling the score to 2–2 in the 57th minute; Uruguay went on to win 4–2.

Cea played his last international match in 1932, having played 27 times for la Celeste.

Managerial career
Cea was the manager of the national team in 1941 and 1942, managing the team that won the 1942 South American Championship.

Death
He died in 1970 aged 70 years 17 days old.

Career statistics

International
Source:

International goals
Uruguay's goal tally first

Honours

Player
Nacional
 Primera División: 1933, 1934
 Torneo Competencia: 1934

Uruguay
 FIFA World Cup: 1930
 South American Championship: 1923, 1924
 Summer Olympics: 1924, 1928

Individual
 1930 FIFA World Cup All-Star Team

Manager
Uruguay
 South American Championship: 1942

References

External links

1900 births
1970 deaths
Footballers from Redondela
1930 FIFA World Cup players
Association football forwards
Uruguayan footballers
Uruguay international footballers
Olympic footballers of Uruguay
Uruguayan football managers
Uruguay national football team managers
Spanish footballers
Spanish football managers
Uruguayan people of Galician descent
Uruguayan people of Basque descent
Uruguayan people of Spanish descent
Uruguayan Primera División players
Spanish emigrants to Uruguay
Club Nacional de Football players
Footballers at the 1924 Summer Olympics
Footballers at the 1928 Summer Olympics
Olympic gold medalists for Uruguay
Medalists at the 1924 Summer Olympics
Medalists at the 1928 Summer Olympics
FIFA World Cup-winning players
Olympic medalists in football
Copa América-winning players
Burials at Cementerio del Buceo, Montevideo